Mahmudabad (also Romanized as Maḩmūdābād and Mahmood Abad; also known as Sālārābād) is a village in Gamasiyab Rural District, in the Central District of Nahavand County, Hamadan Province, Iran. At the 2006 census, its population was 416, in 111 families.

References 

Populated places in Nahavand County